OPP, O.P.P., or Opp may refer to:

Government
 NASA's Office of Planetary Protection
 One Police Plaza (1PP), the Police headquarters in New York City
 Ontario Provincial Police, the provincial police service of Ontario, Canada
 Opp, Alabama, a city in the United States
 Orleans Parish Prison, prison located in New Orleans, United States

Miscellaneous other organizations
 Omega Psi Phi, an international fraternity
 One People's Project, an anti-racist group
 Opp (newspaper), published in Oppdal, Norway
 Open Prosthetics Project, a project dedicated to creation of public domain prosthetics
 Orangi Pilot Project, a development project in slums of Karachi, Pakistan

Science and technology
 Object Push Profile, a Bluetooth communications protocol based on the OBEX protocol
 Octonionic projective plane, or Cayley plane, a projective plane over the octonions
 Oriented Polypropylene, and specifically BOPP (biaxially oriented PP), a polymer used mainly for packaging and labeling
 Ortho-phenylphenol, or 2-Phenylphenol, an organic compound used as a fungicide
 Ovine progressive pneumonia, or ovine lentivirus, a chronic infection of Visna virus that affects sheep
 Yamaha YM2164, an FM synthesis sound chip also called FM Operator Type P (OPP)

Songs
 "O.P.P." (song), a song by Naughty by Nature from the album Naughty by Nature
 "Opps", a song by Vince Staples and Yugen Blakrok

See also
 Opposition (disambiguation), shortened